The 1908–09 international cricket season was from September 1908 to April 1909. The season consists with a single international tour.

Season overview

February

Philadelphia in Jamaica

References

International cricket competitions by season
1908 in cricket
1909 in cricket